Vest-Agder ("West Agder") was one of 18 counties (fylker) in Norway up until 1 January 2020, when it was merged with Aust-Agder to form Agder county. In 2016, there were 182,701 inhabitants, around 3.5% of the total population of Norway. The county administration was located in its largest city, Kristiansand.

Vest-Agder was a major source of timber for Dutch and later English shipping from the 16th century onwards. Historically, the area exported timber, wooden products,  salmon, herring, ships, and later nickel, paper, and ferrous and silica alloys. Compared to other counties of Norway, today's exports-intensive industry produces shipping and offshore equipment (National Oilwell Varco), cranes (Cargotec), ships (Umoe Mandal, Flekkefjord Slip), wind turbine equipment, nickel (Glencore), and solar industry microsilica (Elkem). A major tourist attraction is Kristiansand Dyrepark.

Vest-Agder grew to political prominence with the decision of King Christian IV to establish Kristiansand as a key naval base, trading centre, and bishopric in 1641, forcing urban citizens and merchants from all over Agder to settle in the city. The county had large-scale emigration to North America from the 1850s onwards.

General information

Name

The meaning of the name is "(the) western (part of) Agder".

Lister og Mandal amt was created on 1 January 1662 and it consisted of the two old lens of Lister and Mandal.  This name continued until 1 January 1919, when the name was changed to Vest-Agder.

Coat-of-arms
The coat-of-arms is from modern times.  They were granted on 12 December 1958.  They show an oak tree in yellow on a green background, representing the historic rich nature and oak woods in the area.

Geography

Vest-Agder is the western and southernmost part of the current county of Agder, extending inland from the North Sea and its arm, the Skagerrak, to the southern fringes of Setesdalen, surrounded by the mountain range Setesdalsheiene. It includes the southernmost point of the entire country, Pysen island south of Mandal, and the southernmost part of continental Norway, Lindesnes. It has a very broken and hilly surface.  From the coast there are six valleys that stretch north into the county: Audnedalen, Lyngdalen, Kvinesdalen, Mandalen, Sirdalen, and Otradalen (which continues into Aust-Agder where it is called Setesdalen).

Most of the habitation lies along the coast, including the towns Kristiansand, Mandal, Flekkefjord, and Farsund. About 31 fjords are located there.  The northern portion is mountainous and sparsely settled, while the central upland moors are used for pasturing of cattle and sheep.  Since the Gulf Stream touches the coast of Vest-Agder, it is also called "the Norwegian Riviera", and Agder as a whole is also called "The California of Norway".

History
{{stack|{{Historical populations
|footnote = Source: Statistics Norway.
|shading = off
|1951|96942
|1961|109083
|1971|124171
|1981|136718
|1991|145091
|2001|156878
|2011|172408
}}}}

The oldest ever remains of a 8,000+ year old human in Norway has been found at Søgne, she endured an almost exclusively marine diet. In Kristiansand, a Sarup''-style Neolithic funeral site from 3,400 BC has been excavated. Just before and after the onset of the common era, the region was uniquely rich in sites dedicated to the God Ull (Ullr), and also had a semi-urban settlement at Oddernes (Kristiansand). Norway's first possible all-national king, Halvdan Svarte, was raised probably in the Kvinesdal valley at a matrimonial manor, his mother was presumably the daughter of King Harald of Agder. He was followed  by his son King Harald Fairhair, who had his easternmost manor at Kongsgård near Kristiansand. Churches are known since Viking ages. Vest-Agder was not particularly preeminent in the later Viking and Medieval Ages. Mandal (Vesterrisør) and Kristiansand (Ottrunes) had semi-urban trading centers from the 1300s onwards, but did not enjoy urban economic privileges until the 1632 (Mandal) and 1641 (Kristiansand). A general lack of agricultural fertility made the region remaining a relatively poor part of Norway through the centuries.

In the 16th century, Dutch merchant vessels began to visit ports in southern Norway to purchase salmon and other goods.  Soon thereafter the export of timber began, as oak from southern Norway was exceptionally well suited for shipbuilding.  As the Netherlands developed in the 17th century, it began to suffer from a severe labor shortage, and many families from Vest-Agder and Aust-Agder emigrated to the Netherlands, especially the coastal areas.

In the 19th century, emigration to the United States started.  One of the most important causes of this emigration was the emergence of steamships.  While Vest-Agder and Aust-Agder historically had very strong positions in the manufacture and repair of sailing ships, the shift to steamships was poorly utilised and resulted in a cyclical slope for the shipbuilding and shipping industries. Emigration to the United States was a means of escaping from the high unemployment that followed.
Many Americans returning to the county after Norway became prosperous. This feature is particularly predominant in Kvinesdal and Farsund in the west, which maintains strong cultural links with the United States.

During World War II the area had substantial fortifications and German personnel, with major bases and airfields in Lista, Mandal and Kristiansand. Batterie Vara near Kristiansand was constructed as one out of two 40 cm coastal artillery forts covering the Skagerrak Sea in conjunction with a similar fort in northern Denmark. After the war, Kristiansand grew considerably whereas other cities lost much of their relative economic and demographic importance.

Municipalities
On 1 January 1838, all the counties were divided into local administrative units each with their own governments (see formannskapsdistrikt). The number and borders of these municipalities were based on the parishes of the Church of Norway.  Over time the number and locations of these have changed, and at present there are 15 municipalities in Vest-Agder.  The municipality of Åseral was part of the neighboring county of Nedenes until 1880, when it was moved to Vest-Agder.

Municipalities before 2020

Cities

 Alleen
 Farsund
 Flekkefjord
 Kristiansand
 Lyngdal
 Mandal

Parishes

 Austad
 Bakke
 Bjelland
 Eiken (Egen)
 Farsund
 Feda
 Finsland
 Fjotland
 Flekkefjord
 Flekkerøy
 Frelseren
 Greipstad
 Grim
 Grindheim (Grindum)
 Gyland
 Halse (Halsaa)
 Harkmark
 Haughom
 Hellemyr
 Herad (Herred)
 Hidra (Hitterø)
 Holum (Holme)
 Hægebostad (Øvre Kvinesdal)
 Hægeland (Heggeland)
 Hånes
 Justvik
 Konsmo
 Korshamn
 Kristiansand
 
 Kvinesdal
 Kvævemoen
 Kvås (Qvås)
 Laudal
 Liknes, see Kvinesdal
 Lista (Vanse)
 Ljosland
 Lund
 Lunde
 Lyngdal
 Mandal
 Nes
 Nord-Audnedal
 Netlandsnes
 Oddernes
 Randesund
 Sirdal
 Spangereid
 Spind
 Søgne
 Old Søgne
 Søm
 Sør-Audnedal
 Tonstad
 Torridal
 Tveit
 Valle
 Vanse
 Vennesla
 Vestbygda
 Vigmostad
 Voie
 Vågsbygd
 Øvrebø
 Øvre Sirdal
 Øyslebø
 Åknes
 Åseral
 Flekkefjord Branch (LDS, 1899–1904)
 Kristiansand Branch (LDS, 1856–1912)
 Kristiansand (Katolske Apostoliske, 1896–1925)

Villages

 Alleen
 Andabeløy
 Aukland
 Austad
 Ausvika
 Birkeland
 Bjelland
 Bjørnestad
 Breland
 Brennåsen
 Eik
 Eiken
 Eikerapen
 Feda
 Finsland
 Fjotland
 Fleseland
 Grindheim
 Grovane
 Gyland
 Haddeland
 Harkmark
 Heddeland
 Homstean
 Hægeland
 Hæåk
 Høllen
 Høllen
 Hånes
 Ime
 Justvik (Gjusvik)
 Kilen
 Kirkehavn
 Knaben
 Koland
 Konsmo
 Korshamn
 Krossen
 Kvås
 Kyrkjebygda
 Langenes
 Laudal
 Liknes
 Ljosland
 Lohne
 Loshavn
 Lunde, Sirdal
 Lunde
 Mosby
 Mushom
 Nodeland
 Nodelandsheia
 Ny-Hellesund
 Ore
 Randesund
 Rasvåg
 Røyknes
 Sande
 Skarpengland
 Skofteland
 Skomrak
 Sira
 Sirnes
 Skålevik
 Snartemo
 Storekvina
 Strai
 Svenevig
 Svenevik
 Tangvall
 Tingvatn
 Tonstad
 Trysnes
 Tveit
 Vanse
 Ve
 Vedderheia
 Vennesla
 Vestbygd
 Vigeland
 Vigmostad
 Volleberg
 Øvre Eikeland
 Øvrebø
 Øyslebø
 Åknes
 Ålefjær
 Ålo
 Åna-Sira
 Åros
 Åvik

Former Municipalities

 Austad
 Bakke
 Bjelland
 Bjelland og Grindum
 Eiken
 Feda
 Finsland
 Fjotland
 Greipstad
 Grindheim
 Gyland
 Halse og Harkmark
 Herad
 Hidra
 Holum
 Hægeland
 Konsmo
 Kvås
 Laudal
 Lista
 Nes
 Nes og Hitterø
 Nord-Audnedal
 Oddernes
 Randesund
 Spangereid
 Spind
 Sør-Audnedal
 Tonstad
 Tveit
 Undal
 Vigmostad
 Øvre Sirdal
 Øvrebø
 Øvrebø og Hægeland
 Øyslebø
 Øyslebø og Laudal

Notable residents
:Category:People from Vest-Agder
Sofus Arctander (1845-1924), Liberal politician, Prime Minister for a brief period in 1905.
Bernt Balchen (1899-1973), aeronaut, WWII pilot, polar navigator, military officer.
Jens Bjørneboe (1920-1976), author and playwright.
Camilla Collett (Wergeland) (1813-1895), author, writer, feminist, emancipator.
Bjøro Håland, country & western musician.
Bjarne Lingås (1933-2011), heavyweight boxer, amateur (198, 14 losses) and professional (14, 2 losses).
Rolf Løvland, musician, composer, director, twice winning European Song Contest.
Herman Wedel Major (1814-1854, born in Ireland), regarded as the founder of modern psychiatry in Norway.
Svein Mathisen (1952-2011), football player for IK Start, Hibernian, and Norway.
Mette-Marit, Crown Princess of Norway (1973-), Crown Princess of Norway.
Jørgen Moe (1813-1882), writer, folklorist (Asbjørnsen og Moe), poet, bishop of Kristiansand. 
Nicolai Tangen (1966), hedgefund investor, CEO of the Norwegian Soveregin Wealth Fund (NBIM) since 2020.
Christian Rynning-Tønnesen (1959-), business leader, CEO of Norske Skog, Statkraft.
Emanuel Vigeland (1875-1948), artist, sculptor, painter, creator of Vigeland Park in Oslo.
Gustav Vigeland (1869-1945), artist, sculptor, painter.
Henrik Wergeland (1808-1845), author, writer, playwright, educator, national archivar, bureaucrat, emancipator.

See also
Aust-Agder
Sørlandet
Agder
Former municipalities of Vest-Agder

References

External links
 
 
 Vest-Agder fylkeskommune 
 Vest-Agder: Norway's southernmost county

 
Former counties of Norway
2020 disestablishments in Norway
States and territories disestablished in 2020